Silente is a Croatian rock band, based in Dubrovnik.

Band members
Current members
Sanin Karamehmedović (r. 1987) - bass guitar (2006–present)
Tibor Karamehmedović (r. 1991) - lead vocals, guitar (2006–present)
Ivuša Gojan - drums (2009–present)
Doris Kosović - lead vocals (2012–present)
Šimun Končić - synthesizer, backing vocals (2013–present)
Ivana Čuljak - violin, backing vocals (2018–present)

Past members
Lorena Milina - violin, backing vocals (2006–2016)
Ana Vlainić - violin, backing vocals (2013–2014)
Davor Čupić - rhythm guitar, backing vocals (2006–2010)
Miro Ćuzulan - drums (2006–2009)

Discography
Studio albums
 Lovac na čudesa (2013)
 Neće rijeka zrakom teći (2015)
 Malo magle, malo mjesečine (2018)
 IV (2022)

Lovac na čudesa 

Lovac na čudesa is the band's first studio album. It was released on 28 October 2013 through Aquarius Records, making it their major label debut.

Track listing

Neće rijeka zrakom teći 

Neće rijeka zrakom teći is the band's second studio album. It was released on 4 May 2015 through Aquarius Records.

Track listing

Malo magle, malo mjesečine 

Malo magle, malo mjesečine is the band's third studio album. It was released on 5 June 2018 through Aquarius Records.

Track listing

IV 
IV is the band's fourth studio album. It was released on 10 June 2022.

Track listing

Singles

Awards and nominations

References

Croatian rock music groups
Musical groups established in 2006
Dubrovnik